Gwen Davis (born May 11, 1936) is an American novelist, playwright, screenwriter, songwriter, journalist and poet.

Davis has written eighteen novels, including the bestseller The Pretenders.  She has also written about travel for the Wall Street Journal Europe, for online publications such as the Huffington Post, maintains a popular personal blog, Report from the Front, and a blog reviewing Broadway theater productions, Will Blog for Broadway.

Life
Davis was born in Pittsburgh, Pennsylvania and grew up in New York City, in Manhattan. Her parents were divorced. Her father, real estate developer Lew Davis, later served as mayor of Tucson, winning office in 1961. Her parents' separation when she was five started a lifetime of gypsying. She attended Bryn Mawr College. In 1954, at the age of eighteen, she went to Paris to study music and sang in a nightclub there until she gave into her mother's pleas to return to the U.S.  She moved to California and continued singing, performing at the Purple Onion.  She also obtained a master's degree in Creative Writing from Stanford University.

She was part of the Hollywood social scene from the late 1950s, coming into contact with a wide range of celebrities and befriending Dennis Hopper and many others. Some of her experiences inspired her first novel, Naked in Babylon.  She married businessman and producer Don Mitchell, with whom she had two children, a daughter and a son. One of the Mitchells' mocking Academy Awards parties was the subject of a Time magazine article in 1970, which mentioned some of the celebrities—Shirley MacLaine, Zsa Zsa Gabor, Lee Marvin and others—Davis and Mitchell counted among their friends.
She scripted a famous movie, What a Way to Go, and wrote a play produced on Broadway, The Best Laid Plans.

Davis continues to write.  She travels widely and has lived in Spain, Paris, Rome, London, Venice, New York and Hollywood. She has returned from living in Bali, Indonesia and is living between New York, and Beverly Hills.

Touching lawsuits 
Touching (1971) was not a bestselling novel, but resulted in controversial lawsuits.  Davis spent twenty hours at Sandstone, a Topanga Canyon therapy center run by E. Paul Bindrim, known as the "father of Nude Psychotherapy".  Bindrim, once nearly kicked out of the American Psychological Association, was known for holding what he called "nude marathons"—several clients were "placed in a warm pool for long sessions of touching and massaging, talking and sometimes shouting or acting out rage". After the novel was published, Bindrim sued Davis and Doubleday & Company for libel, on the grounds that it had defamed him.

Davis claimed she had used her real-life experiences to inspire fiction, but that Bindrim was not the psychologist in her fictional story, and did not resemble him—the character she depicted was overweight, looked like Santa Claus, and had a Ph.D.  When the case came to trial, Bindrim, who had previously been bald and clean shaven, and who held only a master's degree, had by then gained weight, grown a white beard, and been granted a Ph.D. from International College in Westwood, California. (Founded in 1970, International College claimed it had "no classrooms, no lecture halls, no resident faculty." An unaccredited institution, it is now out of existence.) These changes made him appear like the psychologist in the book. He won his lawsuit against Davis and her publisher, Doubleday. Doubleday then sued Davis for not disclosing her contractual agreement with Bindrim not to write about the psychotherapy event. Because of the Bindrin precedent, American novelists in America became very concerned about the possibility of lawsuits against writers who used real people as the basis for their fiction. Eventually, Davis settled the lawsuit for an undisclosed amount.

Bibliography 
 Naked in Babylon, 1960
 Someone's in the Kitchen with Dinah, 1962
 The War Babies, 1966
 Sweet William, 1967
 The Pretenders, 1969
 Touching, 1971
 Kingdom Come, 1972
 Changes, 1973
 The Motherland, 1974
 How to Survive in Suburbia When Your Hearts in the Himalayas, 1976
 The Aristocrats, 1977
 Ladies in Waiting, 1979
 Marriage, 1981
 Romance, 1983
 Silk Lady, 1986
 The Princess and the Pauper: An Erotic Fairy Tale, 1989
 Jade, 1991
 Happy at the Bel Air, 1996
 West of Paradise, 1998
 Lovesong, 2000
 Scandal, 2011
 The Daughter of God, 2012

Film and television writing credits

 "Desperate Intruder," 1983 (TV)
 "Better Late Than Never," 1982 
 "What a Way to Go!," 1964

Television and film roles and appearances

Davis appeared in Rich and Famous, 1981, as a party guest.  She was interviewed many times on The Tonight Show Starring Johnny Carson in 1971–1972, and on David Frost and the Virginia Graham Show.

References

External links
 Davis' Official Website, The Only Gwen
 Davis' Official Blog, Report From the Front
 Davis' Blog, Will Blog for Broadway

1936 births
20th-century American novelists
Living people
21st-century American novelists
Writers from New York City
Bryn Mawr College alumni
Stanford University alumni
American women bloggers
American bloggers
American women poets
American women journalists
American women novelists
American women dramatists and playwrights
20th-century American women writers
21st-century American women writers
20th-century American poets
20th-century American dramatists and playwrights
21st-century American poets
American women songwriters
Songwriters from Pennsylvania
Songwriters from New York (state)
Novelists from New York (state)
20th-century American non-fiction writers
21st-century American non-fiction writers